Hee-sup Shin (born 1950) is a South Korean neuroscientist whose work focuses on brain research of genetically engineered mice via gene knockout in order to better understand the human brain. His research resulted in him being named a National Scientist by the Korean Ministry of Science and Technology. He is a former co-director of the Center for Cognition and Sociality leading the Social Neuroscience Group in the Institute for Basic Science (IBS) located at Korea Advanced Institute of Science and Technology (KAIST).

Education 
Shin received his M.D. in immunology from the College of Medicine of Seoul National University in 1974. In 1983, he obtained a Ph.D. in genetics and cell biology from Cornell University. During his Ph.D. studies, he worked for several years as a postdoc in immunology at the Sloan-Kettering Institute for Cancer Research.

Career 
Upon graduating from Cornell, Shin worked as a research associate in genetics at the Sloan-Kettering Institute for Cancer Research until 1985. He then moved to Massachusetts where he held a dual position as an associate professor in the Department of Biology at MIT and as an associate member of the Whitehead Institute for Biomedical Research. In 1991, he returned to Korea to work as an associate professor and later professor in the Department of Life Science in POSTECH where he stayed for a decade. During this time, he also was director of the Biotechnology Research Center in POSTECH and director of the National CRI Center for Calcium and Learning. He was the first researcher within Korea to apply genetics to brain science research and received overseas attention in 1997 upon his discovery of the genes PLC-β1 and PLC-β4, which are related to epilepsy and paralysis.

Leaving POSTECH in 2001, he went to the Korea Institute of Science and Technology (KIST) to be a principal research scientist, a position he held for a decade. In 2005, he became the director of KIST's Center for Neural Science and then director-general of their Brain Science Institute. In 2012, he moved to Daejeon to become founding director of the IBS Center for Cognition and Sociality located at KAIST. The center expanded when Changjoon Justin Lee became a co-director of the center in 2018. Lee leads the Cognitive Glioscience Group while Shin led the Social Neuroscience Group until his retirement in 2020. After his retirement as co-director, he continued research at the Center as Research Fellow Emeritus.

Research 

Shin's work is aimed at understanding how changes in calcium dynamics in nerve cells regulate brain functions. He has been defining the physiological roles that a group of genes play in vivo, whose functions are known to be critical for regulation of intracellular calcium dynamics.

Shin first generates a transgenic mouse for a given gene, and then analyzes the mouse at the molecular, cellular, physiological, and behavioral levels. Shin has been particularly interested in defining the functions of voltage gated calcium channels in normal as well as pathological states of the brain.

In particular, his work on the mutant mouse for a1G T-type calcium channels has provided conclusive evidence that T-type channels in the thalamus of the brain function to block sensory information derived from the body to be delivered to the cerebral cortex. The thalamus is the gateway through which all the somatic sensory information from the periphery must pass through to reach the cerebral cortex, where perception is achieved. Thus, the T-type channel mutant mouse lacking this block showed an enhanced response to visceral pain.

Shin has also shown that the same mutant mouse was resistant to absence epilepsy, a disease characterized by a brief loss of consciousness accompanied by abnormal EEG findings. Together, these results indicate that the thalamus is the brain center, controlling the state of consciousness by gating the sensory information from the outside world to reach the cortex, and that T-type calcium channels are the key element in this gating function.

Honors and awards 
 1983 Frank Lappin Horsfall, Jr. Award, Cornell University Graduate School of Medical Science
 1994 Korean Academy of Science and Technology, Member
 1997 Kumho Science Award, Kumho Foundation
 1997 Hantan Life Science Award, Hantan Foundation
 1998 Award for Excellent Research Paper in Science & Technology, Ministry of Science and Technology
 2000 Hamchun Medical Science Award, Hamchun Foundation
 2003 Person of the Month, Korea Institute of Science and Technology (KIST)
 2004 Scientist-of-the-month Award, Ministry of Science and Technology
 2004 Dupont Prize, Dupont Foundation
 2004 Grand Prize, Korea Institute of Science and Technology
 2004 Ho-Am Prize, Hoam Foundation
 2004 Order of Civil Merit, President of South Korea
 2004 AHF Lectureship Award, Calgary University, Canada
 2005 President, International Behavioural and Neural Genetics Society
 2006 National Scientist, Ministry of Science and Technology
 2008 Distinguished Alumni Award, Cornell University
 2009 National Academy of Sciences of the United States, Foreign Associate
 2010 National Academy of Sciences (NAS), South Korea, Member 
 2013 Star Professor Award, University of Science & Technology
 2015 Hotchkiss Brain Institute Lectureship Award, University of Calgary
 2018 Fellow of American Association for the Advancement of Science
 2020 Francine Shapiro Award, EMDR-Europe Society
 2021 Fellow, IUPS Academy of Physiologists, International Union of Physiological Sciences

References

External links 
 Center for Cognition and Sociality - Social Neuroscience Group

1950 births
Living people
Cornell University alumni
Seoul National University alumni
Massachusetts Institute of Technology School of Science faculty
Academic staff of Pohang University of Science and Technology
South Korean neuroscientists
Institute for Basic Science
Foreign associates of the National Academy of Sciences
Recipients of the Ho-Am Prize in Science